Goran Gančev (born 4 August 1983) is a retired Macedonian footballer who currently assistant coach of FK Pelister in the Macedonian First Football League.

Career

Early career 
Gancev began his career as a youth player for Vardar, a team from his home town of Negotino. He played for the youth selection and made his debut for the senior team at the age of 16 when the team played in the Macedonian 2nd division. At age 17, Gancev signed for the Macedonian club Rabotnicki in Skopje.

Gancev played in the U-18 team in his first season, before moving to the senior squad where he debuted as a central defender.

After three years at Rabotnicki, Gancev moved to Tikves Kavadarci for one year, and then spent the next two years in Skopje playing for Madjari and Metalurg. During this time he finished his education at the Economics faculty of the European University of Skopje.

A move to Kumanovo saw Gancev playing for six months for Baskimi.

Gancev's next move took him to Pelister, in Bitola.

Abroad 
From there, Gancev received several offers to move abroad, and chose Zeljeznicar in Sarajevo, a team playing in UEFA Champions League. In his time in Bosnia and Hercegovina, he also played for six months for Velez Mostar.

In summer 2011, he signed a one-year contract for Croatian team Inter Zapresic, playing there until winter 2012.

Gancev's next destination was Indonesia, with a contract with PSMS in Medan playing in the country's Premier League, where he played in defence. Media and newspapers called him "Big Macedonian", and praised his acceleration, fighting spirit and stability on the ground. Gancev next moved to Indonesian club Persebaya in Surabaya, on a one-year contract.

Al Busaiten Bahrain

In January 2014 officially announced that Gancev sign for current Bahrain Champion FC Busaiteen until the end of the season join the team in the Bahrain Premier League and follow the GCC Gulf Champions League, where rich the 1/4 final. FC Busaiteen was part of the Bahrain King Cup Final. In the big Final Busaiten lose from East Riffa 2-1 and become runner-up.

Semen Padang
 
In early 2015, Semen Padang finally hook Goran Gancev to strengthen the defense wall. Players from Macedonia that completes the quota of three foreign players are allowed to compete in the Indonesian Super League in 2015. Goran's debut for the team was on away against Indonesian Last Champion Persib Bandung.

Pusamania Borneo FC

The Official League of Indonesia which was Temporary Terminated and was Imposed Sanction on Indonesia Football Federation by FIFA made Goran  join Squad of Pusamania Borneo FC where following The Tournament Sudirman CUP.Goran and PBFC reaching Semi-Final.
 
Arema Cronus

February 2016, Goran Gancev certainly become the third foreign player Arema Cronus in the preparation ahead of the Indonesian Super Competition ISC 2016. Players from Macedonia was officially signed a contract with the club in a shield bearing the lion's head. Goran Gancev had previously participated in the inaugural match Arema defended Cup Group A governor of East Kalimantan (Kaltim) in 2016 against Gresik United, Saturday, 27 February 2016. It became his debut, in which Arema won 3-1.
Arema and Goran become Champion of the preseason Cup, winning against last Indonesian Super League Champion Persib in the big Final in Jakarta with result 2-0.
Goran live debut with Arema Cronus in Indonesia Soccer Championship ISC 2016 was against Persiba Balikpapan at home stadion winning the game 2-0.
 
Goran always believed to be the starting line-up for Arema and were able to manage the team top Defence in the League.The Statistic said from 18 games Arema conceded only 5 goals and 15 cleen sheets.

Back to FK Pelister

Gančev re-joined FK Pelister in January 2019, after signing a 18-month long contract.

References

External links 
 Gancev Goran Official
 
 Goran Gancev move to Arema Cronus at IndoBola
 AREMA Cronus Defeat Persib Bandung 2-0, Singo Edan Champion 

1983 births
Living people
People from Negotino
Association football defenders
Macedonian footballers
FK Rabotnički players
FK Tikvesh players
FK Metalurg Skopje players
FK Milano Kumanovo players
FK Bashkimi players
FK Pelister players
FK Željezničar Sarajevo players
FK Velež Mostar players
NK Inter Zaprešić players
PSMS Medan players
Persebaya Surabaya players
Busaiteen Club players
Semen Padang F.C. players
Borneo F.C. players
Arema F.C. players
Gresik United players
Akademija Pandev players
Sriwijaya F.C. players
Macedonian First Football League players
Premier League of Bosnia and Herzegovina players
Croatian Football League players
Liga 1 (Indonesia) players
Bahraini Premier League players
Macedonian expatriate footballers
Expatriate footballers in Bosnia and Herzegovina
Macedonian expatriate sportspeople in Bosnia and Herzegovina
Expatriate footballers in Croatia
Macedonian expatriate sportspeople in Croatia
Expatriate footballers in Indonesia
Macedonian expatriate sportspeople in Indonesia
Expatriate footballers in Bahrain